Cirkevná spojená škola Humenné is a Roman catholic school. The institution comprises three schools:
Nursery school of St. Thérèse of Lisieux ,
Primary school of Sts. Cyril and Methodius   and  
Grammar school of Sts. Cyril and Methodius (a four-year study programme and an eight-year study programme).

Nursery school of St. Thérèse of Lisieux 
Since 5 Sep 2016 Cirkevná spojená škola Humenné comprises Nursery school of St. Thérèse of Lisieux.

External links
 Website of our school  
 Facebook  
 Youtube.

References

 Arcidiecéza of Kosice   

Catholic schools in Slovakia